The 2005 Baltimore Ravens season was the team's tenth season in the National Football League (NFL). They were unable to improve upon their previous output of 9–7, instead going 6–10 and missing the playoffs for the second straight season. The Ravens played on Christmas Day for the first time, defeating the Minnesota Vikings in Baltimore. As of 2021, Baltimore’s 48–3 win over the Green Bay Packers stands as the biggest blowout in Monday Night Football history.

Draft

Staff

Roster

Preseason

Schedule

Regular season

Schedule
In addition to their regular games with AFC North division rivals, the Ravens played games against the AFC South and NFC North according to the NFL’s division schedule, and also played against the New York Jets and the Denver Broncos, who in 2004 finished in the same position as the Ravens (second) in the two remaining AFC divisions.

Standings

References

Baltimore Ravens seasons
Baltimore Ravens
Baltimore Ravens
2000s in Baltimore